Tru Kids, Inc. (doing business as Tru Kids Brands) is an American retail and licensing company that operates the Toys "R" Us locations in the United States. Although they only operate locations in the United States, they own the Toys R Us brand internationally (except in Canada). It was established on January 20, 2019 after its lenders cancelled the bankruptcy auction and took over the Toys "R" Us intellectual property in October 2018.

History 
On October 1, 2018, Toys "R" Us issued a court filing for the bankruptcy, after the company's shut down since June 28, 2018. Tru Kids planned a merge for the company, to rerun as new Toys "R" Us. Tru Kids managed agreements with the company, to be its successor, and to be renamed "Tru Kids" from Geoffrey LLC.

The company unveiled plans for a preliminary venture to be known as Geoffrey's Toy Box (Tru Kids' division), a wholesale store-within-a-store concept that the company planned to deploy in time for the holiday shopping season. The company planned to revive the Toys "R" Us and Babies "R" Us brands in the future. In November 2018, it was announced that agreements had been made with the grocery market chain Kroger. Kroger will add toy displays under the Geoffrey's Toy Box brand to some of its locations, to sell selections of Toys "R" Us private-label products for the holiday season. The brand, Geoffrey's Toy Box, operates as Geoffrey LLC, an intellectual property holding company within Toys "R" Us.

On January 20, 2019, the bankruptcy plan went into effect, and the Toys "R" Us, Inc. trademarks were transferred to Tru Kids.

In July 2019, Tru Kids announced they would open two stores at the Galleria Mall in Houston, Texas and the Westfield Garden State Plaza in Paramus, New Jersey as they touted a United States comeback. As part of opening the stores, Tru Kids partnered with software powered company b8ta to power the physical shopping experience in the new stores.

On October 8, 2019, Tru Kids announced they had partnered with retailer Target to relaunch the Toys "R" Us e-commerce site. As part of the agreement, Target now powers toy assortment and fulfillment capabilities for Toys "R" Us.com and Toys "R" Us retail stores in the United States.

On November 27, 2019, Tru Kids opened their first reimagined United States retail store after being absent from the US retail landscape for over 16 months.

On January 15, 2021, Tru Kids closed their Galleria Mall Toys "R" Us location citing financial losses following the COVID-19 pandemic. Following that, on January 26, 2021, the Garden State Plaza location also closed. Toys "R" Us will continue remain present in the United States as e-commerce only with partnership of Amazon.

In March 2021, brand management firm WHP Global acquired a controlling stake in Tru Kids. WHP announced plans to reopen Toys “R” Us stores in late 2021. WHP announced that they could come in various formats, including: Airport stores, pop-up stores, flagship stores, and mini stores in larger retailers.

Units

Official divisions

 Geoffrey's Toy Box - intellectual rights

Acquired from Toys "R" Us, Inc.

 Toys "R" Us - branding
 Babies "R" Us - branding

References

External links

Toys "R" Us
2019 establishments in New Jersey
American companies established in 2019
Retail companies established in 2019
2021 mergers and acquisitions
Toy retailers of the United States
Companies based in Morris County, New Jersey
Parsippany-Troy Hills, New Jersey
Privately held companies based in New Jersey